The 2017–18 Bradley Braves men's basketball team represented Bradley University during the 2017–18 NCAA Division I men's basketball season. The Braves, led by third-year head coach Brian Wardle, played their home games at Carver Arena in Peoria, Illinois as members of the Missouri Valley Conference. They finished the season 20–13, 9–9 in MVC play to finish in fifth place. They defeated Drake in the first round of the MVC tournament before losing to Loyola–Chicago in the quarterfinals.

Previous season
The Braves finished the 2016–17 season 13–20, 7–11 in MVC play to finish in a tie for sixth place. As the No. 7 seed in the MVC tournament, they defeated Drake in the first round before losing to Wichita State in the quarterfinals.

Offseason

Departures

Incoming transfers

2017 recruiting class

Source

Preseason 
In the conference's preseason poll, the Braves were picked to finish in seventh place in the MVC. Sophomore guard Darrell Brown was named to the preseason All-MVC second team.

Roster

Schedule and results

|-
! colspan="9" style=| Exhibition

|-
! colspan="9" style=|  Non-conference regular season

|-
!colspan=12 style=| Missouri Valley Conference regular season

|-
!colspan=9 style=| Missouri Valley tournament

Source

References

2017-18
2017–18 Missouri Valley Conference men's basketball season
2017 in sports in Illinois
2018 in sports in Illinois